The following is a list of Iranian male actors in alphabetical order.

A 
Arzhang Amirfazli (1970-)
Fariborz Arabnia (1964-)
Hasan Abbasi (1966-)
Akbar Abdi (1958-)
Dan Ahdoot (1978-)
Jonathan Ahdout (1989-)
Jahangir Almasi (1955-)
Siamak Ansari (1968-)
Amir Hossein Arman (1982-)
Farhad Aslani (1966-)
Aziz Asli (1938-2015)
Reza Attaran (1968-)
Nozar Azadi (1938-2021)
Amir Aghai (1975-)
Morteza Aghili
Peiman Abadi
Saber Abar
Ali Ansarian
Ahmad Aghaloo

B 
 Enayatollah Bakhshi (1945-)
 Mehdi Bajestani (1974-)
 Hooman Barghnavard (1969-)
 Pejman Bazeghi (1974-)
 Reza Beyk Imanverdi (1936-2003)
Houman barghnavard
Mohamad Bahrani

D 
Bijan Daneshmand (1958-)
Kambiz Dirbaz (1975-)

E 
Bijan Emkanian (1953-)
Ezzatollah Entezami (1924-2018)
Homayoun Ershadi (1947-)
Javad Ezzati

F 
Parviz Fannizadeh (1937–1979)
Behzad Farahani (1945-)
Hamid Farrokhnezhad (1969-)
Mohammad Ali Fardin (1930–2000)
Mehdi Fat'hi (1939-2004)
Reza Fazeli (1935-2009)
Jahangir Forouhar (1916-1997)
Mohammad Reza Foroutan (1968-)

G 
Ahmad Ghadakchian (1920-2006)
Iraj Ghaderi (1934-2012)
Cihangir Ghaffari (1940-)
Naeim Ghalili (1962-)
Faramarz Gharibian (1941-)
Mohammad Reza Golzar (1977-)
Nematollah Gorji (1926–2000)
Shapur Gharib

H 
 Amin Hayai
Babak Hamidian
Mani Haghighi
 Kazem HajirAzad
 Mehdi Hashemi
Mohamad reza Hedayati
 Shahab Hosseini
Jamshid Hashempour
Javad Hashemi
Farzad Hasani

I 
Hasan Joharchi

J 
 Mohammad Reza Jozi
 Amir Mahdi Jule
Pejman Jamshidifar
Amir Jadidi
Amir Jafari

K 
Ramin Karimloo
 Mohamad Kasebi
Amirhossein Kermanshahi
 Mohammad Ali Keshavarz
 Reza Kianian
 Hamed Komeili
Alireza Khamse
Ardeshir Kazemi
Babak Karimi
Poolad kimiayi

L 
 Hamid Lolayi
Aref Lorestani

M 
 Majid Majidi
 Jamshid Mashayekhi
 Peyman Moaadi
 Arian Moayed
 Mehran Modiri
 Navid Mohamadzadeh
 Ahmad Mehranfar
 Ali Mosafa

N 
 Arsi Nami

P 
 Hosein Panahi
Parviz Parastui
 Atila Pesyani
 Parsa Pirouzfar
Jalal Pishvaian
 Pouria Poursorkh
Hasan Pourshirazi

R 
 Iraj Rad
 Saeed Rad
 Bahram Radan
 Javad Razavian
 Hossein Rajabian
Davoud Rashidi

S 
 Majid Salehi
 Parviz Sayyad
 Houman Seyyedi
 Mohamad Ali Sepanlou
 Reza Shafiei Jam
 Khosrow Shakibaee
Martin Shamoonpour
 Mohammad Reza Sharifinia
 Daryush Shokof
Hootan Shakiba
Sorush Sehat
Mohamadreza Solati
Ali Sadeghi

T 
Amin Tarokh
Hamid Tamjidi
Mohsen Tanabande (1975-)
 Shaun Toub (1963-)
Iraj Tahmaseb

V 
Behrooz Vosoughi (1937-)

Y 
Hossein Yari (1967-)

Z 
Mostafa Zamani (1982-)
Amin Zendegani (1972-)

References

Iranian actors
 
Actors
Iranian